Raymond John Ashcroft (born 28 June 1952) is an English television actor. He is best known for his roles as DS Geoff Daly in The Bill from 1996 to 2000, and Ronnie Marsden on Emmerdale from March to December 2003.

He started in rep theatre - Everyman Theatre Liverpool, Vic Stoke-on-Trent, Crucible Theatre Sheffield, Library Theatre Manchester, Playhouse Theatre Leeds, The Swan Worcester, Northcott Theatre Exeter, Belgrade Coventry, Bush Theatre

Ashcorft played DS Geoff Daly in The Bill from 1996 to 2000. He played Ringo Starr in the biopic TV film Birth of the Beatles (1979)  and he has also appeared in many television productions including Coronation Street, Emmerdale for two years, Heartbeat, Survivors, Dalziel and Pascoe, Hetty Wainthropp Investigates, September Song, The Paul Merton Show, The Royal, All Creatures Great and Small, Prime Suspect, EastEnders, The Chief, Chandler & Co, Hollyoaks, Doctors, The Squad, Children's Ward, Criminal, Truckers.

Currently working with Strawberry Blonde Curls, a leading company in Theatre of Sanctuary.

External links

English male soap opera actors
Male actors from Sheffield
1952 births
Living people